The Nistru is a right tributary of the river Someș in Romania. It flows into the Someș near Cicârlău.

References

Rivers of Romania
Rivers of Maramureș County